Werner Hug (born 10 September 1952 in Feldmeilen) is a Swiss chess player.  Hug was World Junior Chess Champion in 1971 and was Switzerland's leading player of the 1970s.

In 1968 Hug won the Swiss Junior Championship. He was awarded the title of International Master (IM) in 1971, when he became World Junior Champion in Athens. He won the Swiss Championship in 1975.

Hug has played on the Swiss team in the Chess Olympiads eleven times, playing first board in 1972, 1974, 1976, 1980, and 1984.
He also played first board in the World Student Olympiad in 1972 and 1976.

References

External links 
 
 
 
 

1952 births
Living people
Swiss chess players
Chess International Masters
Chess Olympiad competitors
World Junior Chess Champions
People from Meilen District